Begonia domingensis, the peanut-brittle begonia, is a species of flowering plant in the family Begoniaceae, native to the Dominican Republic. A bush or shrub begonia, it is occasionally cultivated, more for its well-behaved growth form than for its flowers or foliage.

References

domingensis
Endemic flora of the Dominican Republic
Plants described in 1859